"Kira Kira" (Japanese: キラキラ; lit. "Glitter") is a song written and recorded by Japanese-American singer-songwriter Ai featuring Japanese comedian and actress Naomi Watanabe. It was released to radio on July 6, 2017, and later as a digital single on August 1, 2017. It served as a single from the deluxe version of Ai's eleventh studio album, Wa to Yo.

Upon its release, "Kira Kira" debuted and peaked at number 19 on the Billboard Japan Hot 100. The song was nominated for the Grand Prix award and won the Excellent works Award at the 59th Japan Records Awards.

Background and release 
An excerpt of "Kira Kira" served as the theme song for the Japanese drama "Kanna-san!". In July 2017, the full version of the song was sent to Japanese J-Wave radio station. Watanabe revealed to J-Wave it was her first full-scale studio recording.

A music video for Kira Kira was released on August 31, 2017.

Accolades

Live performances 
Ai and Watanabe performed "Kira Kira" at the "25th Tokyo Girls Collection". Ai performed the song with Watanabe at the 68th NHK Kōhaku Uta Gassen.

Music video 
Directed by Studio Moross' founder Aries Moross, Ai and Watanabe are seen singing behind a green screen with various animations.

Track listing 
Digital download and streaming

 "Kira Kira"  — 3:40

Charts

Credits and personnel 
Credits adapted from Tidal.
 Ai Uemura – vocals, songwriter, producer, composer
 Naomi Watanabe – vocals
 Uta – producer, composer

Release history

Notes

References 

2017 songs
2017 singles
EMI Records singles
Ai (singer) songs
Songs written by Ai (singer)
Song recordings produced by Ai (singer)